Big Four Conference may refer to one of several conferences between heads of state or foreign ministers of the victorious nations after World War I (1914–18) or during and after World War II (1939–45).

Big Four Conference may also refer to:

 Big Four Conference (Indiana), high school athletic conference that existed in the U.S. state of Indiana from 1954 to 1971
 Big Four Conference (Oklahoma), intercollegiate athletic conference that existed in the U.S. state of Oklahoma from 1929 to 1932
 Big Four Conference (Wisconsin), intercollegiate athletic conference that existed in the U.S. state of Wisconsin from 1923 to 1932